Chaetopelma is a genus of tarantulas that was first described by Anton Ausserer in 1871. They are found in Africa including the countries of Turkey, Syria, Egypt, Cyprus, Greece, Sudan and Cameroon.

Diagnosis 
They can be distinguished from the other tarantula genera, except from Nesiergus, because the presence of clavate trichobothria in two rows on the tarsi. Males have a tibial apophysis consisting of two branches, females having a long and slender spermatheca.

Species
 it contains seven species, found in Africa, Balkans, on Cyprus, and in Syria:
Chaetopelma altugkadirorum Gallon, Gabriel & Tansley, 2012 – Turkey, Syria
Chaetopelma concolor (Simon, 1873) – Turkey, Syria, Egypt
Chaetopelma karlamani Vollmer, 1997 – Cyprus
Chaetopelma lymberakisi Chatzaki & Komnenov, 2019 – Greece (Crete)
Chaetopelma olivaceum (C. L. Koch, 1841) (type) – Cyprus, Turkey, Sudan, Egypt, Middle East
Chaetopelma turkesi Topçu & Demircan, 2014 – Turkey
Chaetopelma webborum Smith, 1990 – Cameroon

In synonymy:
C. aegyptiacum Ausserer, 1871 = Chaetopelma olivaceum 
C. anatolicum Schmidt & Smith, 1995 = Chaetopelma olivaceum 
C. gracile (Ausserer, 1871) = Chaetopelma olivaceum 
C. jerusalemensis (Smith, 1990) = Chaetopelma olivaceum 
C. shabati Hassan, 1950 = Chaetopelma olivaceum 
C. syriacum (Ausserer, 1871) = Chaetopelma olivaceum 
C. tetramerum (Simon, 1873) = Chaetopelma olivaceum

Transferred to other genera 

 Chaetopelma adenense Simon, 1890 →  Ischnocolus jickelii 
 Chaetopelma gardineri Hirst, 1911 → Nesiergus gardineri
 Chaetopelma longipes L. Koch, 1875 → Holothele longipes 
 Chaetopelma olivaceum (Strand, 1907) → Encyocratella olivacea
 Chaetopelma strandi Schmidt, 1991 → Encyocratella olivacea

See also
 List of Theraphosidae species

References

Theraphosidae genera
Spiders of Africa
Spiders of Asia
Taxa named by Anton Ausserer
Theraphosidae